Kord Khil-e Valam (also Romanized as Kord Khīl-e Valam; also known as Kord Khīl) is a village in Jirhandeh-ye Lasht-e Nesha Rural District, Lasht-e Nesha District, Rasht County, Gilan Province, Iran. At the 2006 census, its population was 397, in 113 families.

References 

Populated places in Rasht County